The following is a list of mayors of the city of Mykolaiv, Ukraine. It includes positions equivalent to mayor, such as chairperson of the city council executive committee.

Mayors 

 , 1901-1904
 , 1909-1917
 , 1918
 , 1918
 Evgeniy Nikolaevich Shtemberov, 1929–1930
 Viktor Yakovlevich Konotop, 1930-1932
 Yuli Yulievich Vishnevsky, 1932-1933
 Yakov Lvovich Zhurovsky, 1933
 S. F. Samoilenko, 1933-1936
 Ivan Dmitrievich Makarov, 1936-1937
 Ivan Kuzmich Karasev, 1937-1939
 Efrem Mikhailovich Morgunovsky, 1939-1941
 Alexander Nikolaevich Khromov, 1944-1946
 Georgy Antonovich Mikhailov, 1946-1949
 Pyotr Ivanovich Gurov, 1949-1952
 Grigory Tikhonovich Sirchenko, 1952-1957
 Mikhail Nikolaevich Stefan, 1957-1960
 Konstantin Ionovich Karanda, 1960-1961
 Nikifor Anisimovich Parsyak, 1961-1964
 Grigory Petrovich Yani, 1964-1966
 , 1966-1974
 Ivan Maksimovich Kanaev, 1974-1982
 Alexander Fomich Molchanov, 1982-1990
 Nikolay Yakovlevich Shmygovsky, 1990-1991
 Yuri Ivanovich Sandyuk, 1991-1994
 , 1994-1998
 Anatoly Alekseevich Oleinik, 1998-2000
 Nikolai Valerievich Balakirev, 2000
 , 2000—2013
 , 2013
 , 2013—2015
 , 2015–2017, 2018
 Tatyana Kazakova, 2017— 2018

See also
 Mykolaiv history
 History of Mykolaiv (in Ukrainian)
 Mykolayiv City Council (in Ukrainian)

References

This article incorporates information from the Russian Wikipedia and Ukrainian Wikipedia.

External links

History of Mykolaiv Oblast
Mykolaiv